The total solar eclipse of July 11, 2010, occurred over the southern Pacific Ocean. A solar eclipse occurs when the Moon passes between Earth and the Sun, thereby totally or partly obscuring the image of the Sun for a viewer on Earth. A total solar eclipse occurs when the Moon's apparent diameter is larger than the Sun's, blocking all direct sunlight, turning day into darkness. Totality occurs in a narrow path across Earth's surface, with the partial solar eclipse visible over a surrounding region thousands of kilometres wide. This eclipse was on the same day as the 2010 FIFA World Cup Final.

Visibility

The eclipse on this day was one of the most remote in recorded history. It was visible over much of the southern Pacific Ocean, touching several atolls in French Polynesia, the Cook Islands, Easter Island, and Argentina's Patagonian plains.

Fred Espenak, a NASA astrophysicist, said:

In French Polynesia, the eclipse was seen with 98 percent totality. During that time, the diamond ring effect and the Baily's beads occurred.

It ended at sunset over the southern tips of Argentina and Chile in South America, including the town of El Calafate. The Sun's altitude was only 1° during the 2 minute 47 second total phase, but Argentino Lake offered an adequate line-of-sight to the eclipse hanging just above the rugged Andes skyline.

A 58% partiality occurred at sunset in Santiago, Chile, but it was not visible due to adverse weather conditions. In other cities such as Valparaíso and Coquimbo, clearer skies permitted the event to be witnessed in continental Chile.

Observations 

The global sky photography project The World At Night stationed photographers throughout the eclipse's visibility track. Eclipse chasers photographed the event on board a chartered airplane, cruise ships, numerous Pacific islands, and in Argentina's Patagonia region. Totality was observed for four minutes and 41 seconds (4:41) on Easter Island, where it was observed for the first time in 1,400 years. Approximately 4,000 observers visited Easter Island for this eclipse, including tourists, scientists, photographers, filmmakers and journalists, prompting an increase in security at its important moai archeological sites. The eclipse occurred at the same time that the final game of the 2010 FIFA World Cup was being played in South Africa, and many soccer fans in Tahiti watched the match instead of observing the partial eclipse with a high percentage of obscuring the sun by over 98%. The path of totality of this eclipse barely missed some significant inhabited islands, including passing just about 20 km north of the northern end of Tahiti.

This eclipse was the first one to happen over French Polynesia in 350 years. An estimated 5,000 tourists visited various islands in the archipelago to observe the event. Nearly 120,000 pairs of special glasses were distributed for observers. Eclipse chasers were also able to observe the eclipse at El Calafate, near the southern tip of Argentina, before the sun set just two minutes later.

Several hours after the eclipse was observed in continental Chile, a magnitude 6.2 earthquake struck in the Antofagasta Region. There were no major injuries or damage in the nearby cities of Calama, Chile and San Pedro de Atacama.

Related eclipses

Eclipses of 2010 
 An annular solar eclipse on January 15.
 A partial lunar eclipse on June 26.
 A total solar eclipse on July 11.
 A total lunar eclipse on December 21.

Eclipses cycles 
 It was preceded two weeks earlier by the partial lunar eclipse on June 26, 2010.
 In Saros cycle 146, this eclipse repeats every 18 years 11 days, previously on total solar eclipse of June 30, 1992 and next on total solar eclipse of July 22, 2028. 
 In a tzolkinex cycle, it repeats every 7 years 1 month 1 days, previous as the annular solar eclipse of May 31, 2003 and followed by the total solar eclipse of August 21, 2017.
 In a tritos cycle, it repeats every 10 years 11 months, previous as the total solar eclipse of August 11, 1999 and followed by the annular solar eclipse of June 10, 2021.
 In an inex cycle, it repeats every 29 years minus 20 days, previous as the total solar eclipse of July 31, 1981 and followed by the annular solar eclipse of June 21, 2039.
 The next total solar eclipse will occur on  November 13, 2012.

Solar eclipses 2008–2011

Saros 146 

It is a part of Saros cycle 146, repeating every 18 years, 11 days, containing 76 events. The series started with partial solar eclipse on September 19, 1541. It contains total eclipses from May 29, 1938, through October 7, 2154, hybrid eclipses from October 17, 2172, through November 20, 2226, and annular eclipses from December 1, 2244, through August 10, 2659. The series ends at member 76 as a partial eclipse on December 29, 2893. The longest duration of totality was 5 minutes, 21 seconds on June 30, 1992.
<noinclude>

Metonic series

Notes

References 

NASA pdf map
NASA homepage for July 11 2010 total solar eclipse
NASA: Eclipses During 2010: Total Solar Eclipse of July 11
Eclipser: 2010 July 11 Total Solar Eclipse
Eclipse.org.uk: Total Eclipse of the Sun: 2010 July 11 
 www.spaceweather.com
 Easter Island Eclipse, APOD 7/14/2010
 Andes Sunset Eclipse, APOD 7/15/2010, totality from 400 meters above Argentino Lake
 The Crown of the Sun, APOD 7/21/2010, totality from Easter Island
 Diamond Ring and Shadow Bands, APOD 7/24/2010, totality from Hao, French Polynesia
 Eclipse on the Beach, APOD 7/30/2010, totality from Anakena Beach, Easter Island
 Eclipse Shadow Cone Over Patagonia, APOD 8/4/2010, totality from Patagonia, Argentina

2010 07 11
2010 in science
2010 07 11
History of the Pacific Ocean
July 2010 events
2010 in Argentina
2010 in Chile